Newberry Historic District may refer to:

Newberry Historic District (Newberry, Florida), listed on the NRHP in Florida
Newberry Historic District (Newberry, South Carolina), listed on the NRHP in South Carolina

See also
Boundary Street-Newberry Cotton Mills Historic District, Newberry, South Carolina
Newberry College Historic District, Newberry, South Carolina
Newberry Boulevard Historic District, Milwaukee, Wisconsin, listed on the NRHP in Wisconsin